Hernani, officially the Municipality of Hernani, is a 5th class municipality in the province of Eastern Samar, Philippines. According to the 2020 census, it has a population of 8,531 people.

It was formerly called Nag-as, after the name of the river flowing southeast of the town center.

History 
Hernani was founded around the year 1850 by a settler from Guiuan named Miguel Candido. Hernani, was created into a municipality by virtue of a Royal Order on January 4, 1864.

On October 12, 1897, giant tidal waves struck Hernani. More than 300 people were killed, and public buildings and houses were destroyed, including the newly–built stone church. Following the disaster, the survivors relocated the town center to a more secure place about one–half kilometer inland. This site is now the present location.

Immediately following the Philippine-American War, the political status of Hernani was reduced into a barrio under the jurisdiction of Lanang (now Llorente). In 1912, its status as a municipality was restored but the seat of local government was transferred to Pambujan (now General MacArthur). However, in 1926, the municipality of Hernani regained back the township by virtue of an Executive Order issued by then American Government–General Leonard Wood.

Barangays

Hernani is politically subdivided into 13 barangays. Four barangays, located in the poblacion, are known primarily by number:
 Barangay 1
 Barangay 2
 Barangay 3
 Barangay 4
 Batang
 Nagaja
 Padang
 Carmen
 Garawon
 San Isidro
 Canciledes
 San Miguel
 Cacatmonan

Demographics

Climate

Economy

References

External links
 Hernani E. Samar Official Website
 [ Philippine Standard Geographic Code]
 Philippine Census Information
 Local Governance Performance Management System 

Municipalities of Eastern Samar